Akif Baha Balantekin is an American and Turkish physicist.

He earned his bachelor's degree in physics from Middle East Technical University, Ankara, Turkey in 1975 and received a PhD from Yale University in the U.S. in 1982.

Balantekin is currently the Eugene P. Wigner Professor of Physics at Department of Physics, University of Wisconsin, Madison.
He has been in Madison, Wisconsin since 1986. Before this, he was the Eugene P. Wigner Fellow at the Oak Ridge National Laboratory.
He has served as the Chair of the University of Wisconsin Physics Department until 2011. He is an affiliate professor at the University of Washington, Seattle and has been a visiting professor at Max Planck Institute for Nuclear Physics in Heidelberg, Germany, Tohoku University in Sendai, Japan and the National Astronomical Observatory of Japan in Mitaka, Tokoko.

Awards and honors
 American Physical Society Division of Nuclear Physics Distinguished Service Award, 2010;
 Fellowships of the American Physical Society (1994) and the Institute of Physics of the U.K. (2004);
 TUBITAK Science Prize in Physics, 2001;
 Wisconsin Alumni Research Foundation Mid-Career Award, 1997;
 Alexander von Humboldt Foundation Senior Scientist Award, 1996;
 Japan Society for the Promotion of Science Senior Fellowship, 1994;
 National Science Foundation Presidential Young Investigator Award, 1987;
 Martin Marietta Corporation Jefferson Cup Award, 1986;
 Martin Marietta Energy Systems Author of the Year, 1986;
 Martin Marietta Energy Systems Publications Award, 1986; and
 Francis E. Loomis Fellow, Yale University, 1978.

Professional service
He has served as the Editor-in-Chief, Journal of Physics G: Nuclear and Particle Physics (2005-2010) and the Chair of the American Physical Society Division of Nuclear Physics (2003-2004). He is currently the chair of the Scientific Board of the European Centre for Theoretical Studies in Nuclear Physics and Related Areas (ECT*) in Trento, Italy.

References
 A. Baha Balantekin
 New Page 1
 UW-Madison Physics Faculty Baha Balantekin
 List of Publications of A.B. Balantekin

Year of birth missing (living people)
Living people
Turkish emigrants to the United States
Yale University alumni
University of Wisconsin–Madison faculty
Turkish physicists
Fellows of the American Physical Society